Surprise is the fourth album by country music singer Sylvia. People Magazine reviewed it on 5.14.84:
"Not only has Sylvia changed her look (with the help of makeup artist Way Bandy) to something that's as close to punk as any Nashvillian is likely to get, but she has also gotten a little rambunctious musically. Most of this album, such as William Davidson's "On the Other Side of Midnight" and the Dennis Morgan-Don Pfrimmer tune "Victims of Goodbye," is typical Sylvia, lilting ballads rendered with just the right touches of heartbreak. But there are also a couple of atypically revved-up tracks, especially "Give 'Em Rhythm," a rockabilly stomper by Morgan and Skeeter Davis that includes homages to Elvis and Jerry Lee Lewis, and a lathered-up "One Foot on the Street." Sylvia is not likely to threaten, say, Lacy J. Dalton or any other honky-tonk honey, but she pulls off this digression with style and zest. It provides an enjoyable change of pace on an entertaining LP."

Track listing

Chart performance

1984 albums
Sylvia (singer) albums
RCA Records albums
Albums produced by Tom Collins (record producer)